Henry Maxwell may refer to:

 Henry Maxwell (1669–1730), Anglo-Irish politician and political writer
 Henry Maxwell, 6th Baron Farnham (1774–1838), Irish peer and Church of Ireland clergyman
 Henry Maxwell, 7th Baron Farnham (1799–1868), Irish peer and Member of Parliament
 Henry Maxwell (bishop) (1723–1798), Anglican bishop in Ireland
 W. Henry Maxwell (1935–2010), American politician and Baptist minister from Virginia
 Harry Harrison (writer) (Henry Maxwell Dempsey, 1925-2012), American science fiction author
 Henry Maxwell (rugby league) (c. 1932–2013), New Zealand rugby league player
 Rev. Henry Maxwell, principal character in the 1896 novel In His Steps by Charles Sheldon